The Embassy of Turkey in Beijing is the diplomatic mission of Turkey to China. It is located in the 9 East 5th Street, Sanlitun in the Chaoyang District. It has business, economic, security, customs, cultural, tourism, counselors and military attaché offices.

References 

Turkey
Beijing
China–Turkey relations
Buildings and structures in Chaoyang District, Beijing